George Keith Brooke Bailey (3 January 1882 – 17 June 1964) was an Australian cricketer. He played two first-class matches for Tasmania between 1903 and 1904. His father also played for Tasmania.

See also
 List of Tasmanian representative cricketers

References

External links
 

1882 births
1964 deaths
Australian cricketers
Tasmania cricketers
Cricketers from Hobart